Emile Hemmen (6 December 1923 – 8 January 2021) was a lyric poet and writer from Luxembourg who lived in Mondorf-les-Bains.

Biography 
Hemmen was born in Sandweiler in December 1923. In his youth he refused to do military service for the German national socialist occupants and joined the resistance LPL "Lëtzebuerger Patrioteliga".

From 1945 to 1958 he worked as a teacher. Then he studied in Paris, specializing in psychology and sociology. He worked as an attaché for the Luxembourg Ministry of Education from 1968 to 1969.

Hemmen published over 40 works in French, German and Luxembourgish: a novel, short stories and numerous volumes of poetry. His work has been translated into several languages.es. He also contributed to many anthologies and literary magazines. Besides, he is one of the founders of Éditions Estuaires, one of the most important cultural magazines in the Grand Duchy of Luxembourg.

He died on 8 January, 2021 at the age of 97.

Works 

 Mei Wé (poems), 1948, 78 S., Imprimerie St. Paul
 Lîcht a Schied (novellas), 1950, 48 S., Imprimerie St. Paul
 Begegnungen, 1955, 22 S., Ney-Eicher, Esch-Uelzecht
 Die Maschine, 1956, 21 S., Ney-Eicher, Esch-Uelzecht
 Die Ratte, 1957, 12 S., Ney-Eicher, Esch-Uelzecht
 Ein Heimkehrer, 1958, 23 S., Ney-Eicher, Esch-Uelzecht
 2 Novellen (Die Flut / Das Tier), 1959, 43 S., Ney-Eicher, Esch-Uelzecht
 3 Novellen (Der Zeitungsmann / Die Erbin / Ein Tagebuch), 1960, Imprimerie Ney-Eicher, Esch-Uelzecht
 Gérard de Nerval, Novelle, 1960, Imprimerie Bourg-Bourger
 Innere Spuren (poems), 1981, 41 S., CDR / Cap
 A hauteur d'homme (poems), 1981, 122 S., CDR / Cap
 Messages croisés (poems), 1982, 41 S., CDR / Cap
 L'oeil-piège (poems), 1982, 71 S., CDR / Cap
 Ausschnitte (poems), 1982, 62 S., CDR / Cap
 Le temps d'un dire (poems), 1983, 71 S., CDR / Cap
 Souffles partagés, 1984, 30 S., Impr. Véré (Lille)
 Terre – racines with painter Roger Bertemes, Editions André Biren Paris 1986 (bibliophile edition)
 J'écoute tes yeux, 1989, with painter Henri Kraus / Editions PHI Echternach (bibliophile edition)
 Ballade en blanc, 1990, with painter François Schortgen / Editions de la Galerie de Luxembourg (bibliophile edition)
 Tambours, 1991, 95 S., with painter Emile Kirscht / Éd. Émile Borschette, Impr. J. Beffort (bibliophile edition)
 Au dire de l'arbre, 1991, with painter Raymond Weiland / Editions PHI Echternach (bibliophile edition)
 Feu de haute voix, Editions Alcatraz Press Auxerre France
 Heures de cendre (poems), 1996, 95 S., Michel Frères (Virton)
 Ciels sans abris, 1996, with painter Nico Thurm / Editions PHI Echternach (bibliophile edition)
 À te figer, lumière (poems), 1998, 95 S., Michel Frères (Virton)
 Die Wahl (novel), 2000, 390 S., Rapidpress (Bartreng), 
 Même souffle pour deux voix, 2000, with painter Marc Frising / Harlange / Luxembourg (bibliophile edition)
 White jeans, 2003, Editions Alpha Presse Sulzbach, Germany
 Relire le livre d'heures, 2003, Hudson River Press, New York
 Repainting memory, 2003, Poems, translated from French "Repeindre la mémoire" by Janine Goedert, Igneus Press, Bedford New Hampshire printed in the United States of America
 A l'heure des sources, 2004, with painter Georges Le Bayon Editions Buschmann, Trèves (bibliophile edition)
 Histoires de soifs (poems), 2004, 90 S., Éd. Phi, Esch-Uelzecht, 
 Jeux de pistes – Fährtenspiele, 2006, 155 S., Verl. im Wald (Rimbach), 
 L'Arbre chauve, 2007, Editions Estuaire Collection 99, 
 Anthologie Emile Hemmen, Poète, 2008, Editions mediArt, 
 Derniers retranchements, 2011, Livre d'artiste edited by mediArt, with painter François Schortgen (bibliophile edition)
 Treibholz, 2011, Gedichtzyklus, Editions Alpha Presse Sulzbach, Germany, with CD "Die Sprechdose" (piano recording by Kasia Lewandowska)
 Aus dem nackten Schweigen gehen, 2013, poetry cycle by Emile Hemmen, prints by Petra M. Lorenz, pelo paperart, Editions S'Art S.A., Palma de Mallorca
 Nocturnes, 2013, poems Emile Hemmen, CD "Nocturnes – Fréderic Chopin" interpreted by Romain Nosbaum at Centre Culturel de rencontre Abbaye Neumünster in August 2013 Editions mediArt 
 Dans le miroir du temps, 2014, Editions Estuaires Collection Hors série N°4,

Publications in anthologies 
1952 Livre d'Or de la Résistance Luxembourgeoise 1940–1945 S.519 Luxembourg
 1955 Rappel de la Résistance du 15 au 22 mai LPPD (Ligue vun de Politeschen Prisonnéier an Déportéerten Luxembourg)
 1967 Geschichte der Luxemburger Mundartdichtung 2ter Band S.213 Luxembourg
 1968 Almanach Culturel Luxembourg
 1972 Rappel – 25 Joer LPPD Luxembourg
 1978 Droits de l'Homme /Amnesty International Luxembourg
 1983 Au-delà du désespoir/ Centre de Réadaptation Capellen Luxembourg
 1984 Dialogues / Centre de Réadaptation Capellen Luxembourg
 1985 Partages / Centre de Réadaptation Capellen Luxembourg ( 3 Éditions de luxe- Conception littéraire: Emile Hemmen)
 1985 Die Ganze Welt Anthologie (BECb CBET) Russia1988 Poems from Luxembembourg / Moscou
 1992 La poésie luxembourgeoise contemporaine / Struga / Macédonia
 1995 Intercity (anthologie en trois langues) éditée par le "Lëtzeburger Schrëftstellerverband" Luxembourg
 1997 journées littéraires de Mondorf Luxembourg
 1999 Randwort / Saarbrücker Literaturtage Germany
 1999 Anthologie Luxembourgeoise de Jean Portante / Écrits des Forges (Canada) et Éditions Phi (Luxembourg)
 1999 La Francophonie du Grand-Duché de Luxembourg / Europe Centre – Orientale de Frank Wilhelm
 2000 Devant le monde, le poète / Éditions Alzieu – France
 2004 Anthologie de littérature luxembourgeoise de langue française / Roumania
 2005 Le Mur / Éditions ESTUAIRES Luxembourg
 2006 La femme dans la littérature au Luxembourg / Initiative "Plaisir de lire" Luxembourg
 2007 Quatre artistes, quatre poètes, quatre pays, quatre saisons x 3 Éditions mediArt -Le migrateur sourcier Luxembourg
 2008 Résistance aux guerres par animation Globale du Luxembourg Belgique – Témoignage poème.
 2011 Kolléisch's Jongen am Krich / S. 333 Réminiscences. Luxembourg
 2016 L'Alchimie des pigments / média graphique à Rennes / Éditions Folle Avoine Yves prié / France
 2016 L'Alchimie des pigments / média graphique à Rennes / Éditions Folle Avoine Yves prié /

Publications in magazines 
 1948 -1981 Rappel de la Résistance du 15 au 21 mai Luxembourg
 1960 Le Phare pages culturelles du Tageblatt  Luxembourg
1983 An Dann Capellen  Luxembourg
 1985 BECb CBET Moscou
 1986 – 2009 Revue Estuaires  Luxembourg
 1988 Du verbe à l'acte  Luxembourg
 1988 Revue Alsacienne France
 1989 mémorial Publication Mosellane / Éditions Martin Gerges  Luxembourg
 1991 Orée  France
 1992 Pollen d'Azur N°2  France
 1992 Revue macédonienne Struga Macedonia
 1994 Les Cahiers  luxembourgeois  Luxembourg
 1994 Die Brücke N° 96  Germany
 1995 Totem Éléphant  France
 1996 Journal des Poètes Belgium
 1997 Pollen d'Azur  Belgium
 1998 L'Arme de l'écriture  France
 1999 The Café review USA
 2000 L'Arme de l'écriture  France
 2000 Das Gedicht Germany
 2001 Mir perewoda St. Petersbourg Russia
 2001 Le matin déboutonné N°2+3  France
 2002 ESTUAIRES N° 44+45  Luxembourg
 2002 The Love Book USA
 2004 Comme une promesse  Luxembourg
 2005 Le Mur  édition de tête  Luxembourg
 2007 Matrix Germany
 2007 réCré Éditions Apess  Luxembourg
 2007 Les Cahiers de Poésie  France
 2007 Spéred Gouez N°14 Bretagne   France
 2007 Transilvania Roumania

CD / movie / musical compositions 
 1950 musical composition from the pianist and composer Pierre Nimax Sr. various poems from Emile Hemmen
 2011 / CD Alpha Presse Sulzbach Germany / Die Sprechdose / Klangschale / Piano admission by Kasia Lewandowska interprets 
 2013 Nocturne / Poems from Emile Hemmen ISBN 978 99959-817-1- 6 Éditions médiArt – Musek Nocturnes by Frédéric Chopin – interprets by pianist Romain Nosbaum at Centre Culturel Abbaye Neumünster Luxembourg
 2016 CNL -Poems set to music asbl. Noise Watchers Unlimited Composer Jean Halsdorf / Poem Nocturne VI taken from Nocturne E. H. world creation by Laurie Dondelinger / soprano and Annie Kraus
 Film "Heim ins Reich" director Claude Lahr Luxembourg documentary subsidized by l'UNESCO testimony by Emile Hemmen, résistant – réfractaire under German occupation 1940–1944

Literature 
 Frank Wilhelm: Emile Hemmen. Poète; MediArt, 2008, 240 S.; 
 Laurent Fels, Gaspard Hons, Paul Mathieu, Marcel Migozzi et René Welter: Emile Hemmen; Encres Vives, 2014.

References

External links 
 Official Website of Emile Hemmen
 Emile Hemmen on the Website of the luxembourgish Writers association
 Emile Hemmen in the Authors lexicon
 Ian de Toffoli: "Emile Hemmen. Sa vie. Son œuvre." land.lu, 2009-04-03.

1923 births
2021 deaths
Alumni of the Athénée de Luxembourg
Luxembourgian novelists
Luxembourgian poets
Luxembourg Resistance members